A list of films produced by the Marathi language film industry based in Maharashtra in the year 1926.

1926 Releases
A list of Marathi films released in 1926.

References

External links
Gomolo - 

Lists of 1926 films by country or language
1926
1926 in Indian cinema